Dead Bees on a Cake is a solo album by British singer-songwriter David Sylvian, released in March 1999. It was his first solo album in 12 years since Secrets of the Beehive.

The album peaked at no. 31 in the UK Albums Chart at release and contained his last UK Top 40 single to date in "I Surrender" (no. 40).

In 2018, the album was released on double vinyl for the first time for Record Store Day. This pressing included four songs originally intended for the album (and previously released as part of Everything and Nothing), and a restructured track order.

Background 

Sylvian started out working with Ryuichi Sakamoto in New York and they did three weeks work together. Initially Ryuichi was co-producing the project with Sylvian, and after three weeks work they had about three days work down and it was obvious things weren't working as well as they usually were between the two. So they decided to call it quits. They captured some wonderful moments from the sessions in the string arrangements, the brass and some piano work of Ryuichi's but they were way behind where Sylvian expected to be at that point.

He did a few other sessions in New York and Sylvian then set up a second set of sessions in the Real World Studios in England and the same thing happened to him. He had a series of musicians, and the material wouldn't take shape. The musicians couldn't find their way in the work and it was completely surprising to Sylvian because this had never happened to him before and he didn't think the material was that difficult, so it was baffling. But there he was going through drummer after drummer, bass guitarists, percussionists and really coming away with very, very little.

So Sylvian returned to Minneapolis where he was then living and just basically started sampling the material that he had and reconstructing the arrangements to try and put together a basis from which to get working on the album. Three months and there was very little to show for it. That was the beginning, and it kind of went on like that and he found himself just taking on roles that he hadn't really initially foreseen himself taking on: being the sole producer, taking care of engineering, becoming the maintenance guy, his own studio, anything that just gets down to the basic work of being creative and recording. He reconstructed the pieces through using various samples from a multitude of performances. The challenge really was to keep the whole thing feeling very organic, like there was a group of people playing together, that sonically it sounded very much a part of a whole, which was quite a challenge actually. Probably a greater challenge than actually putting the arrangements together.

Sylvian said about the album 2012:

Track listing
CD pressing

2018 vinyl pressing

Personnel
 David Sylvian – vocals, guitars (all tracks except 2, 6, 8), keyboards (exc. 8, 13), bass (5), drum programming (4, 5, 7, 9), samples (1, 3, 10, 14), string arrangements (1, 8)
 Ryuichi Sakamoto – Fender Rhodes (1, 6, 11), orchestrations and string arrangements (1, 8), brass arrangements (3), sampled guitar and bansuri (7), insects (10)
 Tommy Barbarella – Fender Rhodes (4, 12)
 Marc Ribot – electric guitar (1, 3, 11), acoustic guitar (5, 10), slide guitar (10)
 Bill Frisell – dobro (2, 7), acoustic guitar (7)
 Kenny Wheeler – flugelhorn (1, 4)
 Lawrence Feldman – flute (1)
 Deepak Ram – bansuri (7)
 John Giblin – bass (4, 12)
 Chris Minh Doky – double bass (11)
 Steve Jansen – percussion (1, 7, 9), loops (4, 5), cymbals (4)
 Ged Lynch – original drum track (4), drums (10, 12)
 Skoota Warner – original drum track (5), drums (11)
 Talvin Singh – tabla and percussion (7, 11)
 Steve Tibbetts – gong (7)
 Ingrid Chavez – vocals (7, 9)
 Shree Maa – vocals (13)

Production
 David Sylvian – producer, additional engineer, sound mixing
 Dave Kent – sound engineer and mixing, studio maintenance
 Jacquie Turner – assistant engineer
 Matt Curry – assistant engineer
 Scott Crane – assistant engineer
 Bob Ludwig  – audio mastering

Art work
 David Sylvian – art director
 Yuka Fujii – art director, artwork co-ordinator
 Shinya Fujiwara – drawings
 Anton Corbijn – photography
 Ingrid Chavez – inlay portrait 
 Russell Mills – design (shed)
 Michael Webster – design assistance (storm)

References

David Sylvian albums
1999 albums
Virgin Records albums
Albums with cover art by Russell Mills (artist)